Steinar Haugli (born 1967) is a Norwegian sport shooter who has won the IPSC Norwegian Handgun Championship 9 times, the Dynamic Sports Shooting Norway  championship 3 times, and the NSF Field Shooting Championship Revolver class in 2002. He has been competing actively since 1988.

References 

IPSC shooters
Norwegian male sport shooters
Living people
1967 births